Siavash Hagh Nazari (born 3 August 1995) is an Iranian professional footballer who plays as a attacking midfielder for Uzbekistan Super League club AGMK. Hagh Nazari became the first Iranian footballer in Uzbekistani football .

Club career

Malavan
In summer 2015 he joined to Malavan training camp. He signed a two years contract will Malavan to spend his conscription period with them. He made his professional debut for Malavan with netting once on 20 November 2015 while he used as a substitute against Saipa.

Skala Stryi
Siavash made his debut in Ukraine on 25 September 2017 in a home game loss against Ahrobiznes Volochysk. On 9 November 2017 he became the player of the week.

Volyn Lutsk
On 23 February 2018 he signed contract with Ukrainian First League club Volyn Lutsk. Hagh Nazari was recognized as the best player of April in 2019 in the Ukrainian First League.

International career

U17

He played two marches at the 2010 Asian U16 Championships.

U20
He was part of Iran U20 during 2014 AFC U-19 Championship.

Career statistics

Club

References

External links
 

1995 births
Living people
People from Tehran
Sportspeople from Tehran
Iranian footballers
Orange County SC U-23 players
Malavan players
FC Skala Stryi (2004) players
FC Volyn Lutsk players
Persian Gulf Pro League players
Azadegan League players
Ukrainian Second League players
Ukrainian First League players
Iran youth international footballers
Iran under-20 international footballers
Association football midfielders
Iranian expatriate footballers
Expatriate footballers in Ukraine
Expatriate footballers in Uzbekistan
Iranian expatriate sportspeople in Ukraine